William Johnson is an American former Negro league outfielder who played in the 1940s.

Johnson played for the Philadelphia Stars in 1945. In eight recorded games, he posted five hits in 20 plate appearances.

References

External links
 and Seamheads

Year of birth missing
Place of birth missing
Philadelphia Stars players